Bertelmann is a surname. Notable people with the surname include:
 Fred Bertelmann (1925–2014), German singer and actor
 Volker Bertelmann alias Hauschka (born 1966), German pianist and composer
 Richard Bertelmann, American radio and television personality and broadcasting executive who is professionally known as "Dick Bertel"

See also
 Bertelsmann, German multinational mass media corporation